The Taça Nacional da Guiné Bissau is the top knockout tournament of the Guinea-Bissauan football. It was created in 1976. Some of the competition, the semis and the finals are broadcast on radio (RGB) first aired after independence in 1974 and national television, TGB (Televisão da Guiné-Bissau), the television station was mostly been the only network of the nation up to around 2010.

Winners

1Also not held due to conflict between Benfica Bissau and the FFGB
2The competition was stopped at the 3rd round, the 2nd round match between Tubarões de Bubaque and Cuntum Bissau was postponed to 28 June, the match was never held and the cup competition never progressed, on December 17, the federation annulled the competition
3The cup competition of 2016 continued into the 2017 season and became the only biennial season of the cup competition.  The first phase of the cup competition went on a halt due to financial and economic concerns. The cup competition was replayed for the 2017 season.

Performance By Club

References
RSSSF competition history

Football competitions in Guinea-Bissau
Guine-Bissau
Recurring sporting events established in 1976